The Shoshma (Şuşma; , Šošma) is a river in Mari El, Tatarstan and Kirov Oblast, Russian Federation, a right-bank tributary of the Vyatka. It originates near Maly Kiner, Mari El and flows to the Vyatka near Malmyzh, Kirov Oblast.

Major tributaries are the Sarda, Kushket, Arborka, and Kuguborka rivers. Drainage is regulated. There are peat deposits in the river valley. Since 1978 it has been protected as a "natural monument of Tatarstan'". Baltasi and Malmyzh are along the river.

References 

Rivers of Tatarstan
Rivers of Mari El
Rivers of Kirov Oblast